Tafelsig might refer to:

Places
Table View, a neighbourhood in Cape Town, South Africa.
Tafelsig, Mitchells Plain, a neighbourhood in Cape Town, South Africa.